Edward Bird  (1772 – 2 November 1819) was an English genre painter who spent most of his working life in Bristol, where the Bristol School of artists formed around him. He enjoyed a few years of popularity in London, where he challenged the dominance of Sir David Wilkie in the genre painting field, before moving on to history painting, specialising in battle scenes.

Early years

Bird was born in Wolverhampton, the son of a carpenter. He received no formal artistic training, but developed his skills through apprenticeship as a japanning artist painting tea trays. In 1794 he moved to Bristol, where he married Martha Dodrell and pursued a career in artistic commissions: portraiture, book illustrations, and church painting.

Bristol School
At Bristol, Bird became the centre of an informal group which included other artists such as Edward Villiers Rippingille and Nathan Cooper Branwhite, and which developed into the Bristol School. Initially amateur artists dominated the group, and Bird's closest friends included the amateurs John King, who was also Bird's doctor, and George Cumberland. Cumberland, who moved to Bristol in 1807, became godfather to Bird's son. He had a large art collection from which he would lend items for Bird to study.

The group conducted evening sketching meetings and sketching excursions to scenic locations around Bristol. Landscape with Cottage was probably painted on one of these trips. However, Bird painted landscapes relatively infrequently and he would often accompany the excursions without joining in the sketching. Bird's greatest influence on the Bristol artists was in the naturalistic style and fresh colours of his genre painting, especially so in the case of Rippingille, who worked closely with him. In 1814 they both exhibited works at the Royal Academy with the same subject, The Cheat Detected. Francis Danby, who moved to Bristol from Ireland in 1813 and was to succeed Bird as a leader of the Bristol School, was also influenced by Bird's genre style.

Success

In 1809, he exhibited at the Royal Academy Good News, a genre portrait of an old soldier. Placed next to Wilkie's The Cut Finger, it attracted attention, and Bird's popularity grew when the Prince Regent bought his The Country Choristers and commissioned Blind Man's Buff. His works also include the Field of Chevy Chase and the Day after the Battle, which was pronounced his masterpiece.

Bird was elected an associate of the Royal Academy in 1812, was appointed historical painter to Princess Charlotte in 1813, and elected a full member in 1815.

Plagued by ill-health for over five years and unable to paint in the last year of his life, Bird died on 2 November 1819. He was buried in Bristol Cathedral. The following year a successful retrospective exhibition of his work was shown at the Bristol Fire Office, for the benefit of his family. His son George later became a midshipman, his equipment paid for by the subscriptions of Bird's friends. His daughter Martha became a Bristol watercolourist, and the younger daughter Harriet a governess.

References

Further reading
Francis Greenacre, "Bird, Edward (1772–1819)", Oxford Dictionary of National Biography, Oxford University Press, 2004 accessed 1 July 2007
London. Edward Bird at the Geffrye Museum, Nicholas Alfrey, The Burlington Magazine, Vol. 124, No. 951 (Jun. 1982), p. 372+375+377

External links

 
Arrival of Louis XVIII at Calais
The Battle of Chevy Chase
Italian Dancing Dog Master
 Bristol City Museum and Art Gallery
 Profile on Royal Academy of Arts Collections

1772 births
1819 deaths
18th-century English painters
English male painters
19th-century English painters
People from Wolverhampton
British genre painters
18th century in Bristol
19th century in Bristol
Royal Academicians
19th-century painters of historical subjects
Artists from Bristol
19th-century English male artists
18th-century English male artists